Martha Elizabeth “Marelize” Robberts (born 1986) is a Namibian model and beauty pageant contestant who won the title of Miss Namibia 2008 and represented Namibia in Miss World 2008 in South Africa.

External links
 Marelize Robberts biography and photos

1987 births
Living people
Namibian female models
Miss World 2008 delegates
People from Windhoek
White Namibian people
Namibian beauty pageant winners